The following is a discography of production by Boi-1da.

Singles produced

2006

Keshia Chanté - 2U (album) 
 13. "Been Gone" (Boi 1da Remix)

Drake - Room for Improvement 
 04. "Do What You Do"
 07. "City Is Mine"

Nickelus F - How to Build a Buzz for Dummies 
 24. "Stop Think"

2007

Drake - Comeback Season 
 05. "Replacement Girl" (featuring Trey Songz) (Produced with T-Minus)
 11. "Don't U Have a Man" (featuring Dwele and Little Brother) (Produced with D10)
 16. "Do What U Do (Remix)" (featuring Malice and Nickelus F)

2008

Manafest - Citizens Activ 
 05. "Free"

Point Blank - Point Blank 
 14. "Sensitive Thugs"

Kardinal Offishall - Not 4 Sale 
 02. "Set It Off" (featuring Clipse) 
 05. "Gimme Some" (featuring The-Dream)
 12. "Bring the Fire Out"
 15. "Lighter!"

Drake 
 00. "Look at the Ice" (featuring Nickelus F)

G-Unit - Elephant in the Sand 
 04. "Red Light, Green Light"

Page 
 00. "Still Fly" (featuring Drake)

Lil' Wayne - The Leak V 
 00. Ransom (featuring Drake)

2009

Drake - So Far Gone (mixtape) 
 10. "Best I Ever Had"
 Sample Credit: "Fallin' in Love" by Hamilton, Joe Frank & Reynolds
 12. "Uptown" (featuring Bun B and Lil Wayne) (Produced with Arthur McArthur)
 Sample Credit: "Uptown Girl" by Billy Joel

Fast Life Yungstaz - Jamboree 
 10. "Sauced Up" (Produced with DJ Spinz and FRESH)
 12. "Stop Hatin' 09" (Produced with Key Wane)

Miles Jones - Runaway Jones 
 04. "Never Wrong"

Drake - So Far Gone 
 03. "Best I Ever Had"
 Sample Credit: "Fallin' in Love" by Hamilton, Joe Frank & Reynolds
 04. "Uptown" (featuring Bun B and Lil Wayne) (Produced with Arthur McArthur)
 Sample Credit: "Uptown Girl" by Billy Joel

Nickelus F - Heathen 
 00. "Woo Sah"

Jazzfeezy - Jazzfeezy Presents: Unveiling the Rapture 
 04. "Words Won't Do" (Produced with Jazzfeezy and T-Minus)
 10. "Story to Tell" (featuring Burna, Red Shortz and Regular Robb) (Produced with Jazzfeezy)

King Reign - Reign Music 
 03. "This Means War"

Drake - More than a Game (soundtrack) 
 02. "Forever" (with Kanye West, Lil Wayne and Eminem)

Birdman - Priceless 
 08. "4 My Town (Play Ball)" (featuring Drake and Lil Wayne)
 11. "Mo Milli" (featuring Bun B and Drake)
 15. "Ball Till Ya Fall" (featuring Gucci Mane) (Deluxe Edition Bonus Track)

Eminem - Relapse: Refill 
 01. "Forever" (with Drake, Kanye West and Lil Wayne)

Chip tha Ripper - The Cleveland Show 
 02. "Movie"

Young Jeezy 
 00. "Scared Money" (featuring Lil Wayne)

Jahvon 
 00. "Class In Session"

2010

Red Café 
 00. "I'm Ill" (featuring Fabolous)
 00. "I'm Ill (Remix)" (featuring Ryan Leslie, Lloyd Banks and Claudette Ortiz)

Rick Ross - The Albert Anastasia EP 
 04. "Money Maker"
  Sample Credit: "Bring It Back" by Lil Wayne

Drake - Thank Me Later 
 01. "Fireworks" (featuring Alicia Keys) (Produced with Noah "40" Shebib and Crada)
 04. "Over" (Produced with Noah "40" Shebib and Al-Khaaliq)
 06. "Up All Night" (featuring Nicki Minaj) (Produced with Matthew Burnett)
 09. "Unforgettable" (featuring Young Jeezy) (Produced with Noah "40" Shebib)
 Sample Credit: "At Your Best (You Are Love)" by Aaliyah 
 11. "Miss Me" (featuring Lil Wayne) (Produced with Noah "40" Shebib)
 Sample Credit: "Wild Flower" by Hank Crawford
 16. "9AM in Dallas" (UK iTunes bonus track)

Eminem - Recovery 
 07. "Not Afraid" (Produced with Eminem, Matthew Burnett and Jordan Evans)
 08. "Seduction" (Produced with Matthew Burnett)

Big Boi 
 00. "Lookin' for Ya" (featuring André 3000 and Sleepy Brown)

Stat Quo - Statlanta 
 06. "Catch Me" (Produced with Northern Profit)
 12. "Penthouse Condo" (Produced with Mike Chav)

Bun B - Trill OG 
 04. "Put It Down" (featuring Drake)
 16. "It's Been a Pleasure" (featuring Drake)

Diggy Simmons - Airborne 
 06. "Super Hero Music" (featuring Raekwon)

Das Racist - Sit Down, Man 
 04. "hahahaha jk?"

Skeme - Pistols and Palm Trees 
 04. "Chuck Taylors"
 09. "Til' I'm Gone" (featuring Kendrick Lamar)

King Reign - Reign Music 
 03. "This Means War"

Lil Wayne - I Am Not a Human Being 
 10. "Bill Gates" (Produced with Matthew Burnett)

Rebstar - Arrival 
 13. "Dead or Alive"

Pimp C - The Naked Soul of Sweet Jones 
 02. "What Up?" (featuring Bun B and Drake)

Cassidy - C.A.S.H. 
 13. "Peace"

Nickelus F - Commercials Mixtape 
 04. "Go Head"

Lloyd Banks - H.F.M. 2 (Hunger for More 2) 
 17. "Where I'm At" (featuring Eminem) (Produced with Matthew Burnett) (iTunes bonus track)

Flo Rida - Only One Flo (Part 1) 
 05. "21" (featuring Laza Morgan) (Produced with Ester Dean)

Soulja Boy - The DeAndre Way 
 04. "Speakers Going Hammer"

Keri Hilson - No Boys Allowed 
 01. "Buyou" (featuring J. Cole) (Produced with Matthew Burnett, Bei Maejor and Polow da Don)
 10. "Gimme What I Want" (Produced with Matthew Burnett)
 16. "Fearless" (Japan bonus track)

Rick Ross - Ashes to Ashes 
 04. "Black Man's Dream" (featuring Ludacris)

Kent Money - Becoming 
 10. "See What I Did"

2011

Nicole Scherzinger - Killer Love 
 13. "Casualty" (Additional production by The Maven Boys)

Tinie Tempah - Disc-Overy 
 06. "So Addicted" (featuring Bei Maejor) (Produced with Bei Maejor)

Rebstar 
 00. "Good Life" (featuring Drake and Rock City)

Bizzle - Tough Love & Parabels 
 19. "Forgive Me" (featuring Jin)

Big Lean - Something Gotta Give 
 01. Something Gotta Give (featuring OVO Hush)
05. Sufferin' (featuring Sizzla)
06. You Got It Good
08. Stay A While (Featuring Jeremy Thurber)
09. I Wanna Know
10. Monsters In My Head (Featuring Yikes)

Big Sean - Finally Famous 
 15. "My House" (Produced with Arthur McArthur) (Deluxe Edition Bonus Track)
 Sample Credit: "Ain't There Something Money Can't Buy" by Young-Holt Unlimited

DJ Khaled - We the Best Forever 
 08. "Can't Stop" (featuring Birdman and T-Pain) (Produced with Matthew Burnett)
 09. "Future" (featuring Ace Hood, Meek Mill, Big Sean, Wale and Vado)

Game - Hoodmorning (No Typo) 
 05. "Monsters In My Head"

Game - The R.E.D. Album 
 17. "All I Know" (Produced with Peb Rocks and Big Kast)

Gilbere Forte - "Eyes Of Veritas" 
 13. "Time Life" featuring REE$E

Mindless Behavior - Number 1 Girl 
 08. "Future"

Down with Webster - Time to Win, Vol. 2 
 02. "Professional" (Additional production by Megaman)
 07. "I Want It All" (Additional production by Matthew Burnett)

Slim the Mobster - War Music 
 08. "Whose House?" (featuring Kendrick Lamar)
 Sample Credit: "Ain't There Something Money Can't Buy" by Young-Holt Unlimited

Drake - Take Care 
 03. "Headlines" (Additional Production by Noah "40" Shebib)

Starlito and Don Trip - Step Brothers 
 02. "Chase That Money" 
 07. "In Her Mouth" (Produced with Jazzfeezy)

Ace Hood - The Statement 2 
 14. "Emergency" (featuring Mavado)

2012

Rick Ross - Rich Forever 
 03. "MMG Untouchable" (Produced with Arthur McArthur)
 17. "MMG The World Is Ours" (featuring Pharrell, Meek Mill and Stalley) (Produced with Vinylz)

Chip tha Ripper - Tell Ya Friends 
 08. "25 Wives" (featuring Wale)

Tyga - Careless World: Rise of the Last King 
 06. "I'm Gone" (featuring Big Sean)

Alley Boy - Nigganati 
 07. "Countless"

Game - California Republic 
 18. "Come Up" (featuring Drake and LifeStyle) (Produced with Arthur McArthur)

Lecrae - Church Clothes 
 13. "Gimme A Second"

Crooked I - Psalm 82:V6 
 04. "Monsters in My Head" (featuring Slaughterhouse and Colin Munroe)

Maybach Music Group - Self Made Vol. 2 
 07. "I Be Puttin' On" (Wale (featuring Wiz Khalifa, French Montana and Roscoe Dash) (Produced with The Maven Boys)

Chris Brown - Fortune 
 12. "Party Hard / Cadillac (Interlude)" (featuring Sevyn) (Produced with Brian Kennedy)

Childish Gambino - Royalty 
 04. "Black Faces" (featuring Nipsey Hussle) (Produced with The Maven Boys)
 16. "Wonderful" (featuring Josh Osho)

Nas - Life Is Good 
 19. "Trust" (iTunes Store bonus track)

Roscoe Dash - 2.0 
 08. "Like Diz" (featuring 2 Chainz) (Produced with Vinylz)

D-Why - Don't Flatter Yourself 
 02. "Hawaii"

Busta Rhymes - Year of the Dragon 
 09. "Sound Boy" (featuring Cam'ron)

DJ Khaled - Kiss the Ring 
 11. "Suicidal Thoughts" (featuring Mavado)

Trey Songz - Chapter V 
 10. "Bad Decisions" (Produced with Rico Love)

Slaughterhouse - Welcome to: Our House
 13. "Goodbye" (Produced with Eminem and Matthew Burnett)
 16. "Our Way (Outro)"  (Produced with Eminem and The Maven Boys)

Talib Kweli - Attack the Block 
 06. "Outstanding" (featuring Ryan Leslie)

Kirko Bangz - Procrastination Kills 4 
 02. "Hold It Down" (featuring Young Jeezy)

T-Pain - Stoic 
 01. "The Champ" (featuring Tay Dizm)

DJ Drama - Quality Street Music 
 01. "Goin' Down" (featuring Fabolous, T-Pain and Yo Gotti)
 05. "So Many Girls" (featuring Wale, Tyga and Roscoe Dash)

MGK - Lace Up 
 10. "Runnin'" (featuring Planet VI) (Produced with Jazzfeezy)

Meek Mill - Dreams & Nightmares 
 04. "Traumatized"
 10. "Tony Story (Pt. 2)"

Don Trip - Help Is On The Way 
 09. "All on Me"

French Montana - Mac & Cheese 3 
 10. "Don't Go Over There" (featuring Fat Joe and Wale)

Nicki Minaj - Pink Friday: Roman Reloaded – The Re-Up 
 01. "Up In Flames" (Produced with The Maven Boys)
 02. "Freedom" (Produced with Matthew Burnett)
 04. "High School" (featuring Lil Wayne) (Produced with T-Minus)

The Game - Jesus Piece 
 09. "See No Evil" (featuring Kendrick Lamar and Tank) (Produced with Matthew Burnett)

JoJo - Agápē 
 13. "Can't Handle The Truth"

2013

Rockie Fresh - Electric Highway 
 06. "Life Long" (featuring Rick Ross and Nipsey Hussle) (produced with The Maven Boys)

Joe Budden - No Love Lost 
 04. "NBA" (featuring Wiz Khalifa and French Montana) (Produced with Vinylz)

Big Lean - Can't Stop Now 
 12. "Run It" (featuring Andreena Mill)

Bizzle - The Good Fight 
 01. "Lead Me" (featuring Willie Moore Jr.)
 03. "Do It Again" (featuring Willie Moore Jr.)
 04. "Think 4 A Minute"
 05. "Dear Hip Hop"
 06. "You Know"
 08. "Against You"
 09. "The Way" (featuring Haley Hunt)
 10. "Make Her The Mrs."
 11. "I'm A Christian" (co-produced with The Maven Boys)
 15. "Tomorrow (No Win)"
 16. "My Confession" (featuring Sevin)
 19. "Not Alone" (featuring Nina Sims)
 20. "Better Way Pt.2 (Tribute To Sandy Hook)" (Produced with Vinylz) (Bonus Track)
 21. "Wonder" (Bonus Track)

Talib Kweli - Prisoner of Conscious 
 16. "Outstanding" (featuring Ryan Leslie) (iTunes Bonus)

Kelly Rowland - Talk a Good Game 
 09. "Red Wine" (Produced with Matthew Burnett and Kevin Cossom)

Daniel de Bourg - London Bread 
 02. "Brink of Amazing" (Produced with Vinylz)

Tinashe - Black Water 
 03. "Vulnerable" (Produced with Vinylz)

Iggy Azalea - The New Classic 
 00. "Picture Me Rollin'" (unreleased)

Jay-Z - Magna Carta... Holy Grail 
 04. "FuckWithMeYouKnowIGotIt" (featuring Rick Ross) (Produced with Vinylz & Timbaland)

Ace Hood - Trials & Tribulations 
 06. "We Them Niggas

Drake - Nothing Was the Same 
 10. "The Language" (Produced with Vinylz)
 13. "Pound Cake" featuring Jay-Z

DJ Khaled - Suffering from Success 
 09. "No New Friends (featuring Drake, Rick Ross and Lil Wayne)" (produced with Noah "40" Shebib)

Lecrae - Church Clothes 2 
 08. "Lost My Way" (featuring King Mez and Daniel Day) (produced with Mike DZL)

Vic Mensa - INNANETAPE 
 07. "Time Is Money" (featuring Rockie  Fresh) (produced with The Maven Boys)

Trae tha Truth - I Am King 
 00. "Ride Wit Me" (featuring Meek Mill and T.I.)

Down With Webster - Party For Your Life 
 03. "Chills" (produced with The Maven Boys)

2014

Lil Wayne - Tha Carter V 
 "Believe Me" (co-produced with Vinylz)"
 "Grindin'" (co-produced with Vinylz)"

Schoolboy Q - Oxymoron 
 17. "Yay Yay" (co-produced with The Maven Boys)

Mobb Deep - The Infamous Mobb Deep 
 07. "Low" (featuring Mack Wilds) (co-produced with Sevn Thomas and Havoc)
 11. "Legendary" (featuring Bun B and Juicy J) (co-produced with Havoc and The Maven Boys)

Drake 
 "0 to 100 / The Catch Up" (co-produced with Frank Dukes and Vinylz)"
 "How Bout Now" (co-produced with Jordan Evans)

P. Reign - Dear America 
14. "Realest In The City" featuring Meek Mill and PARTYNEXTDOOR (co-produced with The Maven Boys)

Tinashe - Aquarius 
 03. "Cold Sweat" (co-produced with Syk Sense and Sango)

Astro - Computer Era 
 "Just Dreamin" (Additional production by Bass Line)
 "Nigga Pls" (Additional production by Matthew Burnett)

Nicki Minaj - The Pinkprint 
 01. "All Things Go" (co-produced with Vinylz)"

2015

Kendrick Lamar - To Pimp a Butterfly 
 13. "The Blacker the Berry"

Drake - If You're Reading This It's Too Late 
 02. "Energy" (co-produced with OB O'Brien)
 03. "10 Bands" (co-produced with Sevn Thomas)
 04. "Know Yourself" (co-produced with Vinylz and Syk Sense)
 05. "No Tellin'" (co-produced with Frank Dukes)
 07. "6 God" (co-produced with Syk Sense)
 15. "You & the 6" (co-produced with 40 and Illmind)
 17. "6PM in New York" (co-produced with Frank Dukes, Bobby White and Sevn Thomas)

Big Lean - Enough Is Enough 
 02. "Everyday"
 03. "Bounce Back" (co-produced with ZALE)
 04. "California Water" (Featuring Nipsey Hussle)
 05. "Enough Is Enough"
 06. "Benjamins" (Featuring Juelz Santana)
 09. "Ventilation"
 10. "Eyes on Me" (co-produced with 2Epik)
 14. "I Need More"

Big Sean - Dark Sky Paradise 
 02. "Blessings" (featuring Drake) (co-produced with Vinylz)
 07. "Win Some, Lose Some" (co-produced with T-Minus)

Jamie Foxx - Hollywood: A Story of a Dozen Roses 
 02. "You Changed Me" (featuring Chris Brown) (co-produced with Vinylz, Allen Ritter, Kevin Cossom and Jordan Evans)
 03. "Like a Drum" (featuring Wale) (co-produced with Syk Sense and Kevin Cossom)
 04. "Another Dose" (co-produced with Frank Dukes and Kevin Cossom)
 14. "On the Dot" (featuring Fabolous) (co-produced with Vinylz, Allen Ritter, Kevin Cossom and Kataylst)

Joe Budden - All Love Lost 
 05. "Immortal" (co-produced with Vinylz)
 11. "Love For You"

Drake and Future - What a Time to Be Alive 
 03. "Live from the Gutter" (co-produced with Metro Boomin)

G-Eazy - When It's Dark Out 
 06. "Of All Things" (featuring Too Short) (co-produced with Nickelodeon, Andersson and G-Eazy)

Chris Brown - Royalty 
 01. "Back to Sleep" (co-produced with Vinylz and Allen Ritter)

2016

Rihanna - Anti 
 04. "Work" (co-produced with Kuk Harrell)
 16. "Sex With Me" (co-produced with Frank Dukes, Vinylz, Kuk Harrell)

Kanye West - The Life of Pablo 
 12. "Real Friends" (co-produced with Kanye West, Frank Dukes and Havoc)

Lloyd - Tru (EP) 
 1. "Tru" (co-produced with J.U.S.T.I.C.E. League)
 5. "Tru" (Remix)(co-produced with J.U.S.T.I.C.E. League)

Drake - Views 
 02. "9" (produced by 40, co-produced with Brian Alexander Morgan)
 05. "Hype" (produced with Nineteen85, co-produced by The Beat Bully)
 09. "Faithful" (produced by 40, co-produced with Nineteen85)
 11. "Controlla" (co-produced by Supa Dups and Allen Ritter)

PartyNextDoor - PartyNextDoor 3 
05. "Only U"

Travis Scott - Birds in the Trap Sing McKnight 
14. "wonderful" (produced with T-Minus, co-produced by Mike Dean and Travis Scott)

J. Cole - 4 Your Eyez Only 
03. "Deja Vu"

YG 
00. "Trill"

Full Circle 
 01. "Full Circle" (with Murda Beatz)

2017

Belly - Mumble Rap 
01. "Immigration To the Trap" 
02. "Make a Toast"
05. "Lullaby"
08. "Alcantara"
09. "Clean Edit"

Drake - More Life 
01. "Free Smoke" 
22. "Do Not Disturb"

Eli Sostre 
00. "Glass"

Chris Brown - Heartbreak on a Full Moon 
27. "Tough Love"

2018

Cardi B - Invasion of Privacy 
05. Be Careful 
06. Best Life

Royce da 5'9" - Book of Ryan 
15. Power

Drake - Scorpion 
05. God's Plan
07. 8 Out of 10 
08. Mob Ties 
18. Ratchet Happy Birthday 
24. Final Fantasy

The Carters - Everything Is Love 
06. Friends 
07. Heard About Us

2019

Juice WRLD - Death Race for Love 
02. "Maze"
22. "Make Believe"

Lil Nas X - 7 
07. "C7osure"

Schoolboy Q - Crash Talk 
12. "Crash"

Drake - Care Package 
03. "How Bout Now" 
06. "Draft Day" 
08. "5AM in Toronto" 
10. "My Side"

2020

Kehlani – It Was Good Until It Wasn't
10. "Serial Lover" 
13. "Grieving"

Chloe x Halle – Ungodly Hour
13. "ROYL"

Justin Bieber – Changes
11. "Get Me (featuring Kehlani)"

A Boogie wit da Hoodie – Artist 2.0
11. "R.O.D." 
17. "King of My City"

Lecrae
11. "This is my time."

Aminé – Limbo
7. “Shimmy”

References

External links
Boi-1da at Discogs
[ Allmusic credits]

Discographies of Canadian artists
Hip hop discographies
Production discographies